The beautiful treerunner (Margarornis bellulus) is a species of bird in the family Furnariidae. It is endemic to Panama. Its natural habitat is subtropical or tropical moist montane forests. It is threatened by habitat loss.

References

Margarornis
Birds of Panama
Endemic fauna of Panama
Birds described in 1912
Taxonomy articles created by Polbot